Nery may refer to:

People
 Adalgisa Nery (1905–1980), Brazilian poet, journalist and politician
 Alex Felipe Nery (born 1975), Brazilian football player
 Carl Nery (1917–2007), American American football player
 Constância Nery (born 1936), Latin American painter
 Filipe Nery Rodrigues, Indian politician
 Filipe Nery Xavier (born 1801)
 Guillaume Néry (born 1982), French free diver
 Gustavo Nery, Brazilian football player
 Hadson Nery (born 1981), Brazilian football manager
 Harison da Silva Nery (born 1980),, Brazilian football player
 Ismael Nery (1900–1934), Brazilian artist
 Jessica Nery Plata (born 1994), Mexican boxer
 João W. Nery (1950–2018), Brazilian writer, psychologist, and LGBT activist
 Loris Néry (born 1991), French football player
 Luis Nery (boxer) (born 1994), Mexican boxer
 Luis Nery (model) (born 1978), Venezuelan model
 Luis Nery Caballero (born 1990), Paraguayan football player
 Nery (footballer) (1892–1927), Brazilian football player
 Nery Bareiro (born 1988), Paraguayan football player
 Nery Brenes (born 1985), Costa Rican sprinter
 Nery Cano (1956–2021)
 Nery Cardozo (born 1989), Paraguayan football player
 Nery Castillo (born 1984), Mexican football player
 Nery Domínguez (born 1990), Argentinian football player
 Nery Fernández (born 1981), Paraguayan football player
 Nery Franco (born 1959), Paraguayan football player
 Nery Geremias Orellana (1985–2011), Honduran radio station manager
 Nery Kennedy (born 1973), Paraguayan javelin thrower
 Nery Leyes (born 1989), Argentinian football player
 Nery Mantey Niangkouara (born 1983), Greek swimmer
 Nery McKeen (born 1957), Cuban middle distance runner
 Nery Medina (born 1981), Honduran football player
 Nery Minchez (born 1963), Guatemalan weightlifter
 Nery Ortíz (born 1973), Paraguayan football player
 Nery Pumpido (born 1957), Argentinian football player and manager
 Nery Saguilán (born 1988), Mexican boxer
 Nery Santos Gómez (Caracas, Venezuela, 1967), Venezuelan-American author
 Nery Soto, Honduran journalist
 Nery Veloso (born 1987), Chilean football player
 Paulo Ricardo Nery (born 1962), Brazilian musician
 Peter Solis Nery, Filipino poet, fictionist, author, and filmmaker
 Remilson Nery (born 1961), Brazilian musician
 Ron Nery (1934–2002), American American football player
 Sebastião Nery, Brazilian writer and journalist

Places
 Mont Néry, mountain in northwestern Italy
 Néry, northern France, a commune

Other
 Affair of Néry